Bezměrov is a municipality and village in Kroměříž District in the Zlín Region of the Czech Republic. It has about 500 inhabitants.

History
The first written mention of Bezměrov is from 1078.

References

Villages in Kroměříž District